Richard Elliot Sandomir (born September 4, 1957) is an American journalist who is an obituary writer for The New York Times. He wrote about sports, male-pattern hair loss and television; he is the author of several books including Bald Like Me: The Hair-Raising Adventures of Baldman and The Englightened Bracketologist: The Final Four of Everything.

Education and family
Sandomir obtained his degree from Queens College, City University of New York. His wife, Griffin Miller, is an artist and writer.

Career
Sandomir was a freelance writer and focused his work on sports for a number of publications which include: The New York Times, the Los Angeles Times, the Washington Post, Sports Illustrated, and Sports. He also worked for Sports Inc. as a staff writer, a business reporter for New York Newsday, a staff writer for the Stamford Advocate, and a business writer for Financial World.

Sandomir worked for The New York Times as a television, sports. and business reporter from April 1991 to 2016.

Books
Bald Like Me: The Hair-Raising Adventures of Baldman, Collier Books, 1990, 
Friendly Persuasion- Putnam, 1990
The Joy of Baldness: Men With Less Hair and the Women Who Love Them, Spi Books, 1993.
 

Books with Mark Reiter
The Final Four of Everything- Simon & Schuster, 2009, 

Books with Rick Wolff
Don't Worry, Stop Sweating...Use Deodorant- Andrews Mcmeel Pub, 1998, 
Life for Real Dummies - Perennial, 1996,

References

External links
 Richard Sandomir at The New York Times

Living people
20th-century American journalists
21st-century American journalists
American business and financial journalists
Obituary writers
American male journalists
The New York Times sportswriters
Queens College, City University of New York alumni
1957 births